Rönne may refer to:

 Rönne, Swedish and German name of Rønne
 Carl Ewald von Rönne, a German-born Russian cavalry officer
 Rönne (river), river in Germany

See also 

 Ronne (disambiguation)